The Pactum Lotharii was an agreement signed on 23 February 840, between Republic of Venice and the Carolingian Empire, during the respective governments of Pietro Tradonico and Lothair I. This document was one of the first acts to testify to the separation between the nascent Republic of Venice and the Byzantine Empire: for the first time the Doge, on his own initiative, undertook agreements with the Western world.

The treaty included a commitment on the part of the Venetians to help the empire in its campaign against the Slavic tribes. In return, it guaranteed Venice's neutrality as well as its security from the mainland. However, the treaty did not end the Slavic plunderings since by 846, the Slavs were still recorded menacing cities such as the fortress of Carolea. This underscored the way the pact was more symbolic because it merely reiterated the agreements that had been already made in the past between the two empires. It concerned the rights of land use and administration of justice.

It is also a valuable document that allows to know precisely the territory of the ancient Venetian duchy. The boundaries thus coincided with the old limit of the lagoons (the most extensive of currents), and the mainland reached even the Abbey of St. Hilary and the area of the ancient Altinum.

The Pactum was renewed by kings Charles III (887), Berengar I (888), Guy (891), Rudolf (925), Hugh (927), Otto I (967) and Otto III (983).

See also
 Economic history of Venice

References

Treaties of the Republic of Venice
Foreign relations of the Carolingian Empire
9th-century treaties
9th-century manuscripts
840
9th century in the Republic of Venice